The Merat, Mehrat or Merat-Chauhan are a Rajput community from the state of Rajasthan in India and the provinces of Punjab and Sindh in Pakistan.

References

Rajput clans of Rajasthan